FEANI (Fédération Européenne d'Associations Nationales d'Ingénieurs / European Federation of National Engineering Associations) is a federation of national professional bodies representing engineering in European countries.  Founded in 1951, it aims to promote the recognition, mobility and interests of Europe's engineering profession. FEANI maintains a database of recognised engineering qualifications and also maintains a (non-comprehensive) register of professionally qualified engineers from member countries.

The FEANI register and European Engineer status
FEANI maintains a register of professionally qualified engineers from member countries.  Individuals may have their names added to the register through the national member institution of their own country.  To register, candidates need to have undergone at least seven years of "formation" including at least three years of engineering education and at least two years of professional engineering experience. (The balance of three years can be made up of any combination of engineering education, training and professional engineering experience.)

FEANI grants engineers whose names are on the FEANI register the title European Engineer and the corresponding "Eur Ing", "EUR ING" prefix.  However, European Engineer and the Eur Ing designation are not legally recognised in all countries.
The European Commission has acclaimed the register as a good example of a profession's self-regulation, and indicated that member states will find the FEANI register helpful when deciding whether foreign engineers are qualified to practice; the Commission concluded that engineers on the register "should not normally be required to undertake an adaptation period or sit an aptitude test" in order to practice in European countries.

List of national members

References

External links
 FEANI official website

Engineering societies
International scientific organizations based in Europe
1951 establishments in Europe
Organisations based in Brussels
Organizations established in 1951